Jean-François Novelli (born in 1970) is a contemporary French tenor born in Fontainebleau.

Career 
Novelli holds a master's degree in musicology in  the Sorbonne, winner of the Concours général and first prize for recorder, and turns to singing. He graduated from the Conservatoire de Paris after receiving the teachings of A-M Bondi, Rachel Yakar, Christiane Patard and was immediately admitted to postgraduate studies.

Noticed, he is one of the young talents selected for the midem of Cannes. Fascinated by baroque music, he won the First Prize of the Sinfonia competition in 1997 with Patricia Petibon and the  ensemble (jury présided by Gustav Leonhardt).

He perfected his skills with the tenor Howard Crook and collaborated with the principal French formations specialized in the repertoires of the 17th and 18th centuries: Il Seminario Musicale, Les Arts Florissants, les Talens Lyriques, Le Concert Spirituel, Le Poème Harmonique, the Éléments, the Ensemble Jacques Moderne, Les Paladins etc.

Discography 
 Armida abbandonata by Jommelli
 Motets de Danielis et Motets de Leo under the direction of Christophe Rousset
 Motets by Scarlatti and Oratorios by Charpentier with Gérard Lesne 
 Les quatre saisons by Boismortier with the festes Vénitiennes
 Amour et Mascarade around Purcell, with Patricia Petibon and the ensemble Amarillis. 
Marc-Antoine Charpentier, Trois Histoires sacrées, Mors Saülis et Jonathae H.403, Sacrificium Abrahae H.402, Dialogus inter angelum et  pastores H.406, Il Seminario Musicale, dir. Gérard Lesne. CD Astrée Naïve 2000/2001. "choc" du Monde de la Musique, ffff de Télérama)
 Marc-Antoine Charpentier (1673-1704) – Molière: Hommage pastoral au Roi Soleil et autres grivoiseries with Cassandre Berthon and Valérie Gabail (sopranos), Robert Getchell (French-style haute-contre), Jean-Baptiste Dumora (basse taille) and the Amarillis ensemble. CD Ambroisie 2004
 Grands motets of Dumont with the Ricercar Consort of Philippe Pierlot
 Works by Berlioz with Jérôme Correas and Arthur Schoonderwoerd
 Nova Metamorphosis: a program centered around Monteverdi and another one Boesset with Le Poème Harmonique
 Jephté by Carissimi under the direction of Joël Suhubiette with the ensemble Les Éléments
 Un programme Carrissimi with "Les Paladins" of Jérôme Correas
 Un programme Charpentier with the mastership of Versailles and Olivier Schneebelli
 Tirannique Empire..., cantatas by Jean-Baptiste Stuck with the ensemble Les Lunaisiens.
 FRANCE 1789, Révolte en musique d'un sans-culotte et d'un royaliste with the ensemble Les Lunaisiens

References

External links 
 Jean-François Novelli on "Les Passions"
 Jean-François Novelli on  RSB artists
 Jean-François Novelli on Opera Musica
 Jean-François Novelli on Abbaye de Fontmontrigny
 Jean-François Novelli on Discogs
 Jean-François Novelli on You Tube

People from Fontainebleau
1970 births
Living people
Conservatoire de Paris alumni
French operatic tenors
21st-century French singers
21st-century French male singers